van de Hulst may refer to:

2413 van de Hulst, asteroid
Hendrik C. van de Hulst, Dutch astronomer